Lluís Muncunill i Parellada (Sant Vicenç de Fals, Fonollosa (Province of Barcelona); 25 February 1868 - Terrassa, Province of Barcelona, 25 April 1931), was a Catalan architect involved in the Modernisme català movement.

After earning his degree in 1892, he worked in the city of Terrassa for 40 years, designing numerous buildings of various types, including public, religious, industrial and residential. Between 1892 and 1903, he served as the municipal architect. He was influenced by other modernist architects such as Antoni Gaudí and Lluís Domènech i Montaner.

Selected works

Selected works include:
 Town hall of Terrassa (1900-1902)
 Masia Freixa (1907-1910) 
 Dyeing hall of Izard factory (1921)
 Joan Barata house (1905)
 Hotel Peninsular (1903)
 Emili Matalonga house and warehouse  (1904)
 Baltasar Gorina house (1902)
 Sociedad General de Electricidad (1908)
 Joaquim Alegre warehouse (1904)
 Condicionamiento Tarrasense (1915-1917)
 Marcet i Poal warehouse (1920)
 Pere Font Batallé factory (1916)
 Gran Casino del Foment de Terrassa (1920)
 Palau d'Indústries (1901)

References

External links

19th-century Spanish architects
20th-century Catalan architects
Modernisme architects
1931 deaths
1868 births
People from Barcelona
Architects from Catalonia